Red is a Big Finish Productions audio drama based on the long-running British science fiction television series Doctor Who.

Plot
The citizens of the Needle are all chipped to prevent them from committing violence. When the Seventh Doctor and Mel arrive, they arouse interest as the only people able to cause harm...

Cast
The Doctor — Sylvester McCoy
Mel — Bonnie Langford
Nuane — Denise Hoey
Leterel — Ann Jenkins
Chief Blue — Sean Oliver
Draun — Peter Rae
Celia Fortunaté — Kellie Ryan
Whitenoise — John Stahl
Vi Yulquen — Sandi Toksvig
Uviol — Steven Wickham

External links
Big Finish Productions – Red

2006 audio plays
Seventh Doctor audio plays